These are the Canadian number-one albums of 2013. The chart is compiled by Nielsen Soundscan and published by Jam! Canoe, issued every Sunday. The chart also appears in Billboard magazine as Top Canadian Albums.

Number-one albums

See also 
List of Canadian Hot 100 number-one singles of 2013
List of number-one digital songs of 2013 (Canada)

References

External links 
 Top 100 albums in Canada on Jam
 Billboard Top Canadian Albums

2013
Canada Albums
2013 in Canadian music